The Olympus M.Zuiko Digital ED 14-150mm f/4-5.6 II is a Micro Four Thirds superzoom lens announced by Olympus Corporation on February 5, 2015.

14-150mm F4-5.6 II
Camera lenses introduced in 2015